The 1973 Asian Basketball Confederation Championship for Men were held in Manila, Philippines.

Preliminary round

Group A

Group B

Final round

Classification 7th–12th

Championship

Final standing

Awards

References
 Results
 archive.fiba.com

1973 in Asian basketball
1973
International basketball competitions hosted by the Philippines
1973 in Philippine basketball
December 1973 sports events in Asia